Rasher is a British comic strip published in the comics magazine The Beano, featuring Dennis the Menace's pet pig Rasher. It was initially drawn by David Sutherland and published five years after the character's first appearance. Due to The Beano 2012 continuity, Rasher's daughter (also named Rasher) has succeeded the role, particularly in Dennis And Gnasher: Unleashed!.

Character background 
Rasher is a pig obsessed with food, either seen eating it (usually by stealing the food from an unsuspecting human) or daydreaming about it. A method of attack to get the food is by either butting humans or racing past them quick enough so they fail to notice their food has disappeared.

Publication history

Introduction to The Beano 
Rasher made his first appearance in The Beano in issue 1920 in Dennis the Menace and Gnasher. Dennis and Gnasher walk by a farm and notice the farmer's pig used its trough to prank him. Dennis is intrigued and successfully takes the pig off the relieved farmer's hands, naming it Rasher.

Rasher comic strip 
Rasher received his eponymous comic strip in issue 2201, illustrated by Dave Sutherland. It is notable of being the last comic strip published with Harold Cramond as Beano chief-editor. Early stories also featured Rasher's family, such his brother Hamlet, his sister Virginia Ham, Uncle Crackling and Little Piglet, who were all introduced in the first episode. The series ran for over a decade in over 500 issues, and ended in 1995.

From issue 3480, older Rasher strips were reprinted in full colour in The Beano. Lew Stringer helmed the reboot from issue 3660, which was a part of the Funsize Funnies section. This new series has appeared infrequently throughout the 2010s.

Subsequent appearances 
Rasher has appeared in Dennis' comic strips sporadically, unlike Dennis' other pet, Gnasher, who stars in every issue (apart from a few issues in 1986). Rasher is absent in the Dennis the Menace cartoon adaptations, notably not appearing in 2009's Dennis and Gnasher, despite the cartoon featuring Dennis' grandmother having a pet pig named Harley. Eventually, Rasher returned in Beano 3601, featuring in Dennis and Gnasher alongside Harley.

Issue 3649 shifted Beano continuity as Gok Wan gave Dennis' parents a makeover, which was later revealed that Dennis' father turned into the original Dennis who had grown up, married and had his own children. Stringer's Rasher reboot implies this change does not affect Rasher, but in the franchise retooling for Dennis and Gnasher: Unleashed!, the Rasher who appears in the cartoon is black and white like a cow, and revealed as the daughter of the Rasher the original Dennis owned. Unlike her father, she prefers eating turnips.

As of September 2021, Rasher's last appearance in The Beano was in issue 4048.

In Beano media 
Rasher appears in other parts of Beano franchise. In The Beano Annuals, Rasher's stories have appeared from 1986 to 1989's editions, but Rasher actually appeared a few annuals earlier in Rasher-themed puzzle games in 1984's and 1985's. The Rasher series mostly appeared in 1983's, 1985's and 1987's Beano Summer Specials.

The new Rasher appeared in the 2014 annual, where she was drawn by David Sutherland.

References

Notes

Citations

External links 
 of Rasher's first appearance on the Beano website
 from Dennis & Gnasher: Unleashed! fact file on Beano.com

Beano strips
Comics characters introduced in 1979
1984 comics debuts
1988 comics endings
Comics spin-offs
Gag-a-day comics
Comics about animals
Comics about pigs
British comics characters
Fictional pigs
Male characters in comics
Dennis the Menace and Gnasher